In principle, the term Sheriff was coined by the Slovenian media in reference to local politicians, usually mayors, who are faced with accusations of political corruption, cronyism or clientelism and are faced or charged with criminal investigations and indictments. These politicians are usually successful in eluding the law and in some cases manage to stay in office even after being found guilty by the court of law.

The "Three big Sheriffs"
The "Three big Sheriffs" refers to mayors:
Zoran Janković (Ljubljana)
Franc Kangler (Maribor) – being a native of Duplek, he is sometimes referred to as the "Sheriff from Duplek"
Boris Popović (Koper)

Local Sheriffs
Mohor Bogataj (Kranj)
Tomaž Drolec (Komenda)
Franc Horvat (Tišina)
Alojzij Kastelic (Trebnje)
Franc Škufca (Žužemberk)
Bojan Šrot (Celje)
Primož Zupančič (Dol pri Ljubljani)

Former Sheriffs
Pavel Rupar (Tržič)
Franc Kangler (Maribor)

See also
 2012 Maribor protests

References

Politics of Slovenia
Corruption in Slovenia